{{Infobox person
|name=Paul Mayhew-ArcherMBE
| birth_date  = 
|education=Eastbourne College
|alma_mater=
|occupation=Writer, television and radio producer, script editor
|organization=BBC
|years_active=1987–present
|known_for=The Vicar of DibleyMy HeroOffice GossipOld Harry's GameRoald Dahl's Esio TrotI'm Sorry I Haven’t A ClueRadio Active
}}

Paul Mayhew-Archer MBE (born 6 January 1953) is a British writer, producer, script editor and actor for the BBC. He is best known as the co-writer of The Vicar of Dibley and Esio Trot alongside Richard Curtis. His solo writing career includes My Hero and Office Gossip, which he created. He was the script editor for Old Harry's Game (which he also produces), Two Pints of Lager and a Packet of Crisps, Grownups, Home Again, Coming of Age and Big Top.

Mayhew-Archer is also an amateur actor who has appeared in Drop the Dead Donkey and Mrs. Brown's Boys.

In October 2020, he was appointed MBE for services to people with Parkinson's disease and cancer.

Career
Before becoming a script writer for the BBC, Mayhew-Archer worked in radio as a producer of comedy programmes including I'm Sorry I Haven't a Clue, and before that as an English teacher.

His most notable works are The Vicar of Dibley (main co-writer with Richard Curtis, the series' creator) and My Hero (main co-writer with creator Paul Mendelson), although he has also script-edited Old Harry's Game (which he also produces), Two Pints of Lager and a Packet of Crisps, Grownups, Home Again, Coming of Age and Big Top, as well as for the first series of Miranda. Episodes of Two Pints of Lager and a Packet of Crisps contain scenes set in fictional pubs called The Mayhew (first series only) and The Archer, both named after him. He co-wrote Roald Dahl's Esio Trot for BBC One. He also wrote An Actor's Life for Me, a situation comedy series on radio and television, which starred John Gordon Sinclair as a struggling young actor. Other significant radio credits of his include producing Radio Active.

In addition, Mayhew-Archer appeared on screen in an episode of Drop the Dead Donkey (1996) and as a Life Insurance Officer in the first episode of the second series of Mrs. Brown's Boys''.

Mayhew-Archer performed stand-up comedy at the 2018 Edinburgh Fringe Festival.

Personal life
Mayhew-Archer was born on 6 January 1953; he attended Eastbourne College and went on to study English at St Catharine's College, Cambridge. He spent his spare time at school writing plays. While at Cambridge, he was a scriptwriter and performer with Andy Hamilton in the Cambridge University Light Entertainment Society. 
He lives in Abingdon, Oxfordshire with his wife Julie.
In 2011, he was diagnosed with Parkinson's disease.

References

External links
 Paul Mayhew-Archer at BBC Scotland
 

20th-century English male actors
20th-century English writers
21st-century English male actors
21st-century English writers
Alumni of St Catharine's College, Cambridge
BBC radio producers
BBC television producers
English comedy writers
English male television actors
English television writers
Living people
People educated at Eastbourne College
People from Abingdon-on-Thames
Place of birth missing (living people)
1953 births
English male writers
British male television writers